Cícero Augusto Ribeiro Sandroni (born February 26, 1935) is a Brazilian journalist.

Early life
Sandroniwas born in the city of São Paulo, on February 26, 1935, the son of Ranieri Sandroni and Alzira Ribeiro Sandroni (both born in Guaxupé, Minas Gerais). He did his primary studies and part of junior high school in São Paulo. After his family moved to Rio de Janeiro in 1946, he completed his secondary studies there. He studied at the Faculty of Journalism (now Communication) at the Pontifical Catholic University and EBAP - Brazilian School of Public Administration, at the Getúlio Vargas Foundation, where he was a fellow.

Work
In 1954 he did his first internships in newspaper newsrooms, initially at Tribuna da Imprensa, under Carlos Lacerda, and then at Correio da Manhã, under the direction of Antônio Callado and Luiz Alberto Bahia, where he became head of reporting. Invited by Odylo Costa, he joined the editorial staff of Jornal do Brasil, at the time of the editorial reform of the newspaper, and at the same time he worked at Rádio Jornal do Brasil. In July 1958 he moved to O Globo where, selected for foreign policy coverage, he made several international trips, including to Chile to cover the Extraordinary Conference of American Chancellors, and to the United States, where he was invited by the US State Department and sent by O Globo to write about Nikita Khrushchev's first visit to the UN. On the same occasion, he interviewed Alexander Kerensky, then at the Hoover Institute in Stanford University, in California. He also participated events at the university honoring the poet Cecília Meireles.

In April 1960, he joined the O Globo team, which, headed by Mauro Salles, covered the inauguration of the new capital Brasília. That same year he took over as head of political reporting for Diário de Notícias, then under the direction of Prudente de Morais, where he wrote the column “Political Notes”, replacing Heráclio Salles. Invited by José Aparecido de Oliveira and by the mayor of Brasilia, Paulo de Tarso Santos, in 1961 he moved to the new capital, where he was Press Secretary of the Prefecture of the Federal District, and also director of Public Relations at Novacap. At the same time, alongside José Aparecido, he coordinated the team, led by Candido Mendes de Almeida, that prepared the first (and only) address from President Jânio Quadros to the National Congress. He was a member of the Fiscal Council of the Cultural Foundation of Brasília, chaired by Ferreira Gullar, alongside then deputy José Sarney.

In the parliamentary government of João Goulart / Tancredo Neves, he was deputy head of the cabinet of Minister Franco Montoro, in the portfolio of Labor and Social Security and in 1962 he was appointed government representative in the Fiscal Council of the Institute of Retirement and Pensions of Maritime (IAPM), being that same year elected president of the organ, from which he was dismissed in April 1964. With the installation of the military regime, he returned to work at the Tribuna da Imprensa of Hélio Fernandes, and at O Cruzeiro, under the direction of Odylo Costa. With Odylo, Álvaro Pacheco and the diplomat Pedro Penner da Cunha, he acquired a printing press, from whose machines came the first two editions of the literary magazine Ficção, edited with the collaboration of Antônio Olinto and Roberto Seljan Braga. Then, with Pedro Penner da Cunha, he founded Edinova, a pioneer publication in Brazil that took in Latin American literature and the French roman nouveau.

In 1965 he participated in a conference of journalists in Bonn, Germany, which resulted in the creation of the international news agency Interpress Service, of which he was director in Brazil. That same year he returned to Correio da Manhã, where he wrote the daily column “Quatro Cantos!”, in opposition to the military government, and worked alongside Otto Maria Carpeaux, Franklin de Oliveira, Paulo Francis, José Lino Grünewald, Osvaldo Peralva and Newton Rodrigues. Alceu Amoroso Lima praised his work in an article published in the Jornal do Brasil around this time. With the censorship imposed on the press after Institutional Act nº 5, he left daily journalism and joined Bloch Editores, where he was editor-in-chief of the magazines Fatos e Fotos, Manchete and Tendência. Under his leadership, the latter received, in 1974, the Esso Journalism Award, in the category of Best Contribution to the Press.

In 1976, he directed, for Fernando Gasparian, the last phase of the Jornal de Debates, a political and economics weekly founded by Mattos Pimenta, which became famous in the 1950s in the struggle for the creation of Petrobras. Still in 1976, he launched Ficção magazine again, with Fausto Cunha, Salim Miguel, Eglê Malheiros and Laura Sandroni. In the second phase, in 44 editions, Ficção published more than five hundred Brazilian authors. That same year he coordinated, with writers Rubem Fonseca, Lygia Fagundes Telles, Nélida Piñon, Hélio Silva, José Louzeiro, Ary Quintella and Jefferson Ribeiro de Andrade, a manifesto against censorship of books, signed by more than a thousand Brazilian intellectuals, known as the Manifesto of the Thousand. Published in the press, the document protested the continued censorship of books, which prohibited the circulation of more than four hundred titles by Brazilian and foreign authors. The same group renewed the Rio de Janeiro Writers Union and installed Antonio Houaiss to its presidency.

In 1977, at the invitation of Walter Fontoura, he returned to Jornal do Brasil initially as a writer for Caderno B, where he wrote about art and culture and was a film critic. Then he edited the literary supplement "Livro" and from 1979 to 1983 he wrote the column "Informe JB". In 1984 he signed the column “Ponto de Vista”, in the newspaper Ultima Hora, with the collaboration of the poet José Lino Grünewald. At that time, he was one of the first journalists to defend the holding of direct elections for the presidency of the Republic. In 1984 he edited the Jornal do País, a weekly newspaper by Neiva Moreira and, in 1985, he wrote articles on politics for the Tribuna da Imprensa. He collaborated with Elle magazine, where he published profiles of artists and writers and collaborated with book reviews for the literary page of O Globo. That same year he started to collaborate with Companhia Vale do Rio Doce in the area of cultural matters.

He was editor of their house-organ Jornal da Vale and coordinated two editions of the National Ecology Award, instituted by CVRD and supported by CNPq., Petrobras and SEMA. In 1990 he was editor-in-chief of Tribuna da Imprensa and then went on to write a weekly page on culture and politics. In 1991, he founded the literary monthly RioArtes for the city of Rio de Janeiro, which he directed until he was invited, in late 1992, by the then Minister of Culture, Antonio Houaiss, and the president of Funarte, Ferreira Gullar, to direct the Department of Cultural Action (DAC). At DAC, among other activities in the field of plastic arts and music, he organized the National Salon of Plastic Arts of 1993 and 1994 and the Music Biennial of 1994. On the same occasion he directed, with Ferreira Gullar and Ivan Junqueira, the magazine Piracema. He was Culture and Opinion Editor for Jornal do Commercio in 1995, but he left the following year to write, with Laura Sandroni, the biography of Austregésilo de Athayde.

He returned to Jornal do Commercio in 2000, as deputy director of the newsroom and participated, with Antônio Calegari, in the major reform that modernized the newspaper. He created the cultural supplement Arts and Shows and left the newsroom in August 2003 to write the story of Jornal do Commercio.

Cícero Sandroni has participated in several juries of journalistic awards, notably the Esso de Jornalismo, the Embratel Journalism Award and the CNPq Scientific Journalism Award. In the area of literature, he was a member of the jury for the short story contest of Ficção magazine, and the Goethe Prize for literature at ICBA. Contributor to newspapers and magazines, he has participated in seminars on journalism and literature and delivered lectures on those topics in university centers. He wrote prefaces for several books, including Memórias Improvisadas by Alceu Amoroso Lima and Medeiros Lima.

He is the sixth occupant of Chair No. 6 at the Brazilian Academy, to which he was elected on September 25, 2003, in succession to Raimundo Faoro with 36 votes (the unanimity of the voters). He was received on November 24, 2003 by Candido Mendes de Almeida. In the same year, he was elected Treasurer in the Presidency of Ivan Junqueira, and two years later, Secretary-General of Minister Marcos Vinicios Vilaça. He took office as President of the Academy on December 13, 2007, elected unanimously by his peers. He was president of ABL in 2008 and 2009.

Personal life
Married since January 1958 to the writer Laura Constância Austregésilo de Athayde Sandroni, he has five children, Carlos (1958) sociologist and Doctor in Ethnomusicology by the University of Tours, France; Clara (1960), singer and bachelor of music from UniRio; Eduardo (1961), actor and theater director graduated from CAL; Luciana (1962) author of children's literature and master of literature at PUC SP and Paula (1970), actress, theater director and post-graduate in theater from UniRio. The couple has a grandson, Pedro, born in August 2003.

References

Brazilian journalists
20th-century Brazilian people